Hovhannes ( (reformed);  (classical)), also spelled Hovhanes,  Hovannes or Hovanes is Armenian for John. (Compare with Ioannes in Greek or Johannes in Latin.)

People with the given name

Hovannes
 Hovannes Adamian (1879–1932), Soviet Armenian engineer
 Hovannes Amreyan (born 1975), Armenian weightlifter
 Hovannes "Ivan" Gevorkian (1907–1989), prominent Armenian surgeon and scientist

Hovhannes
 Hovhannes Abelian (1865–1936), Armenian actor
 Hovhannes Aivazovsky, Russian Romantic painter
 Hovhannes Avetisyan (1939–2000), Armenian painter
 Hovhannes Avoyan (born 1965), serial entrepreneur, investor, and scholar
 Hovhannes Avtandilyan (born 1978), Armenian diver
 Hovhannes Azoyan (born 1967), Armenian actor and presenter
 Hovhannes Babakhanyan (born 1968), Armenian-American actor and singer
 Hovhannes Bachkov (born 1992), Armenian boxer
 Hovhannes Badalyan (1924–2001), Armenian singer and professor
 Hovhannes Bagramyan (1897–1982), Soviet Armenian military commander and Marshal of the Soviet Union
 Hovhannes Barseghyan (born 1970), Armenian retired weightlifter
 Hovhannes Chekijyan (born 1928), Armenian conductor and art director 
 Hovhannes Danielyan (born 1987), Armenian light flyweight amateur boxer
 Hovhannes Davtyan (actor) (born 1985), Armenian actor
 Hovhannes Davtyan (born 1983), Armenian judoka
 Hovhannes Demirchyan (born 1975), Armenian football player
 Hovhannes Erznkatsi (c. 1250–1326), Armenian scholar
 Hovhannes Gabuzyan (born 1995), Armenian chess Grandmaster 
 Hovhannes Galstyan (born 1969), Armenian film director, writer, and producer
 Hovhannes Goharyan (born 1988), Armenian footballer and manager
 Hovhannes Hakhverdyan (1873–1931), first Minister of Defence of the First Republic of Armenia
 Hovhannes Hambardzumyan (born 1990), Armenian football player
 Hovhannes Harutyunyan (born 1999), Armenian footballer
 Hovhannes Hintliyan (1866–1950), Armenian teacher, pedagogue, publisher, and educator
 Hovhannes Hisarian (1827–1916), Ottoman Armenian writer, novelist, archeologist, editor, and educator
 Hovhannes Hovhannisyan (1864–1929), Armenian poet, translator and educator
 Hovhannes I of Ani, King of Ani (1020–1040)
 Hovhannes Imastaser, a medieval Armenian multi-disciplinary scholar
 Hovhannes Kasparian,  Armenian Catholic Catholicos-Patriarch of Cilicia
 Hovhannes Katchaznouni (1868–1938), the first Prime Minister of the First Republic of Armenia
 Hovhannes Mamikonean, 10th-century Armenian noble
 Hovhannes Masehyan (1864–1931), Iranian Armenian translator and diplomat
 Hovhannes Mkrtchyan (born 1991), Armenian figure skater
 Hovhannes Sargsyan (born 1987), Armenian cross-country skier
 Hovhannes Setian (1853–1930), Armenian short story writer, poet, and teacher
 Hovhannes Shiraz (1915–1984), Armenian poet
 Hovhannes Tahmazyan (born 1970), Armenian footballer
 Hovhannes Tcholakian (1919–2016), Turkish-Armenian Archbishop of the Armenian Catholic Church
 Hovhannes Ter-Mikaelyan, an Armenian politician
 Hovhannes Tertsakian (1924–2002), bishop of the Catholic Church in the United States
 Hovhannes Tlkurantsi, Armenian poet
 Hovhannes Tumanyan (1869–1923), Armenian poet and writer
 Hovhannes Vahanian (1832–1891), Ottoman politician, minister, social activist, writer, and reformer
 Hovhannes Varderesyan (born 1989), Armenian Greco-Roman wrestler
 Hovhannes XII Arsharuni (1854–1929), Armenian Patriarch of Constantinople
 Hovhannes Zanazanyan,  Soviet football player and coach
 Hovhannes Zardaryan (1918–1992), Armenian painter
 Hovhannes, Catholicos of Armenia or John V the Historian, Catholicos of Armenia from 897 to 925

See also
 Alan Hovhaness (1911–2000), American composer
 Hovhannisyan (surname)
 List of Armenian Patriarchs of Jerusalem
 List of Armenian Patriarchs of Constantinople
 List of Armenian Catholicoi of Cilicia
 Adapa#As Oannes (Hovhannes  in Armenian)
 Ohannes

Armenian masculine given names